The 2005 Formula Ford Zetec Cooper Tires Championship Series was the fifth the USF2000 Ford Zetec championship. Aiken Racing driver Jay Howard took the title in a Van Diemen RF03. He was the second Brit to win the championship, after Dan Wheldon in 1999.

Race calendar and results

Final standings

References

U.S. F2000 National Championship seasons
2005 in American motorsport